Foggy Highway is an album recorded by Paul Kelly and the Stormwater Boys and originally released in  May 2005 on EMI in Australia and Capitol Records in the US. It peaked at #6 on the Australian Recording Industry Association (ARIA) End of Year - 2005 Country chart. On 18 October 2005 it was re-released by Cooking Vinyl and included a four track bonus disc. In October 2010, the May 2005 version of Foggy Highway was listed in the book, 100 Best Australian Albums at No. 66, with Paul Kelly and the Coloured Girls' album, Gossip (1986) at No. 7.

The album is similar in nature to Kelly's earlier album Smoke in that the songs were a mixture of new songs in addition to songs Kelly had recorded on previous albums, all performed here in a folk/bluegrass style.  The songs to appear on previous albums were "Rally Round the Drum" and "Ghost Town" (appearing on Hidden Things),  "Don't Stand So Close to the Window" (appearing on Under the Sun),  "Foggy Highway" (appearing on Live, May 1992), and "Cities of Texas" (appearing on So Much Water So Close to Home).

Track listing 
All songs were written by Paul Kelly, except where noted.
 "Stumbling Block" – 4:06
 "Rally Round the Drum" (Kelly, Archie Roach) – 5:29
 "Ghost Town" – 3:23
 "Song of the Old Rake" – 2:48
 "Don't Stand So Close to the Window" (Kelly, Alex McGregor) – 2:58
 "Passed Over" – 3:25
 "They Thought I Was Asleep" – 3:36
 "You're Learning" (Charlie Louvin, Ira Louvin) – 2:26
 "Foggy Highway" – 3:03
 "Down to My Soul" – 3:57
 "Cities of Texas" – 5:49
 "Meet Me in the Middle of the Air" – 2:37

Limited edition bonus disc
 "Little Boy Don't Lose Your Balls" – 1:59
 "Rank Stranger" (Albert E. Brumley) – 3:22
 "Erina Valley Breakout" (Mick Albeck, James Gillard, Paul Kelly, Rod McCormack, Ian Simpson, Trevor Warner) – 2:04
 "Surely God Is a Lover" (Paul Kelly, John Shaw-Neilson) – 2:25

Personnel
Paul Kelly & the Stormwater Boys
 Paul Kelly  - vocals, guitar
 Mick Albeck - fiddle
 James Gillard - double bass
 Rod McCormack - guitars
 Ian Simpson - banjo
 Trevor Warner - mandolin

Tracks 6 and 10
 Jim Fisher - guitar
 Gerry Hale - mandolin
 Fred Kuhnl - double bass
 Nigel McClean - fiddle
 Ian Simpson - banjo

Track 4
 Scott Owen - double bass

Track 8
 Kasey Chambers - vocals

Credits
 Engineered, Mastered and Mixed by Ted Howard
 Engineered by Simon Polinski
 Produced by Paul Kelly and Rod McCormack
 Photography by Ted Howard and Rod McCormack
 Cover by Reg Mombassa

Charts

Certifications

References

2005 albums
Paul Kelly (Australian musician) albums
EMI Records albums
Albums produced by Rod McCormack
Capitol Records albums